Anthony French is a British lightweight rower. He won a gold medal at the 1978 FISA Lightweight Championships in Copenhagen with the lightweight men's eight.

References

Year of birth missing (living people)
British male rowers
World Rowing Championships medalists for Great Britain
Living people